Bogislaw VII (before 1355 – 1404) was a Duke of Pomerania-Stettin from the House of Griffins.

Life 
Bogislaw VII was the son of Duke Barnim III "the church founder" ( – 1368) and his wife, Agnes of Brunswick-Grubenhagen.  After his father's death in 1368, he ruled Pomerania-Stettin jointly with his older brothers Casimir III and Swantibor III.

Casimir III died in battle in 1372 during a war against Brandenburg.  Swantibor III and Bogislaw VII continued to rule Pomerania-Stettin jointly.  Bogislaw VII is described as a Duke, equal in status to his older brothers.  He was, however, overshadowed by them.

Bogislaw VII died in 1404. After his death, his brother Swantibor III ruled Pomerania-Stettin alone.

The Codex Gelre, a collection of coats of arms from the late 14th Century, mentions a "Duke of Groswin".  This may have been Bogislaw VII.

See also 
 List of Pomeranian duchies and dukes

References 
 Klaus Conrad: Herzogliche Schwäche und städtische Macht in der zweiten Hälfte des 14. und im 15. Jahrhundert, in: Werner Buchholz (ed.): Deutsche Geschichte im Osten Europas: Pommern, Siedler Verlag, Berlin, 1999, p. 127-202.
 Martin Wehrmann: Geschichte von Pommern, vol. 1, 2nd ed., Verlag Friedrich Andreas Perthes, Gotha, 1919, reprinted: Augsburg, 1992,

Footnotes 

Dukes of Pomerania
House of Griffins
14th-century births
1404 deaths
14th-century German nobility